S. Muthu (1915-1984) was a Tamil Social activist of the Dravidar Kazhagam and one of the five founding leaders along with CN Annadurai, Nedunchezhian, NV Natarajan and Mathiazhgan of the Dravida Munnetra Kazhagam and emerged a king maker when CN Annadurai died during DMK's first term in power and helped his then ally Muthuvel Karunanidhi to emerge as the leader of the party and Chief Minister of Tamil Nadu. He was the chief ally of Karunanidhi when the later ousted MG Ramachandran (MGR) from DMK. When Karunanidhi consolidated his power base and increasingly eliminated the old horses of the party Mr Muthu was disillusioned with the party and later joined MGR's the Anna Dravida Munnetra Kazhagam just less than two years into the existence of ADMK in 1976. He was a powerful leader in the southern districts and helped MGR in his election campaign with his depth of knowledge of the electorate across the length and breadth of Tamil Nadu and helped ADMK storm into power in 1977. He served as the popular Mayor of Madurai from 1971 to 1981. He also served as a member of the Tamil Nadu Legislative Council.

References 

1915 births
1984 deaths
Politicians from Madurai
Tamil Nadu municipal councillors
Mayors of places in Tamil Nadu
20th-century Indian politicians
Tamil Nadu politicians